Siberry is a surname. Notable people with the surname include: 

Jane Siberry (born 1955), Canadian singer-songwriter
Michael Siberry (born 1956), Australian actor